Pop Fiction is an American practical joke television series that debuted on March 9, 2008 on E!. The series is hosted by Peter Katona, and in the spirit of Punk'd, the show creates fake gossip for the paparazzi.

Tagline
Is it real, or is it Pop Fiction?
Celebrities who try to trick the reporters say the tagline "Is it real, or is it Pop Fiction?" at the end of the clips, similar to Punk'd, where celebrities say "I just got punk'd!"

Episodes

References

2000s American comedy television series
2008 American television series debuts
2008 American television series endings
English-language television shows
2000s American reality television series
E! original programming
Practical jokes